Edward of Middleham, Prince of Wales ( or 1476 9 April 1484), was the son and heir apparent of King Richard III of England by his wife Anne Neville. He was Richard's only legitimate child and died aged ten.

Birth and titles
Edward was born at Middleham Castle, a stronghold close to York that became Richard and Anne's principal base in northern England. His birth date is usually given as around December 1473, but he may have been born as late as 1476. Professor Charles Ross wrote that the date 1473 "lacks authority. In fact, he was probably not born until 1476." The act of Parliament that settled the dispute between George of Clarence and Richard over Anne Beauchamp's inheritance just as if the Countess of Warwick "was naturally dead" was dated May 1474.<ref>Ross, C.D., Richard III, St. Ives 1981, p.30</ref> The doubts cast by Clarence on the validity of Richard and Anne's marriage were addressed by a clause protecting their rights in the event they were divorced (i.e. of their marriage being declared null and void by the Church) and then legally remarried to each other, and also protected Richard's rights while waiting for such a valid second marriage with Anne. There were no provisions, however, for their heirs in case of this said divorce, which seems to confirm Richard and Anne had no children as of 1474. However, such provision was the province of the ruling king for those of royal blood, so would have been moot.

Edward was mostly kept at Middleham, and was known to be a sickly child.

In 1478, Edward was granted the title of Earl of Salisbury, previously held by the attainted George Plantagenet, 1st Duke of Clarence. The title became extinct on his death. His father became King of England on 26 June 1483, deposing his nephew Edward V. Edward did not attend his parents' coronation, which was probably due to illness. He was created Prince of Wales and Earl of Chester in a splendid ceremony in York Minster on 8 September 1483, following his parents' royal progress across England.

Death
The reasons for his sudden death are unknown. The Croyland Chronicle'' reads:

Edward's sudden death left Richard without a legitimate child. Contemporary historian John Rous recorded that Richard declared his nephew Edward, Earl of Warwick, his heir-presumptive, but there is no other evidence of this, and seems unlikely as Richard's own claim was based on the attainting of Warwick's father. Similarly, John de la Pole, 1st Earl of Lincoln also seemed to have been designated as Richard's heir-presumptive, but was never publicly proclaimed as such.

Richard's enemies were inclined to believe that Edward's sudden death was divine retribution for Richard's alleged involvement in the usurpation and subsequent disappearance of the sons of Edward IV, his nephews Edward V of England and Richard, Duke of York. It may have also emboldened them to renew hostilities.

Burial

The location of Edward's burial is unknown. A mutilated white alabaster cenotaph ("empty tomb") in the Church of St Helen and the Holy Cross at Sheriff Hutton, with an effigy of a child, was long believed to represent Edward of Middleham, but is now thought to be an earlier work depicting one of the Neville family.

Titles, styles, and arms

Titles
15 February 1478 onwards: Earl of Salisbury
26 June 1483 onwards: Duke of Cornwall
19 July 1483 onwards: Lord Lieutenant of Ireland
8 September 1483 onwards: Prince of Wales and Earl of Chester

Arms

From 1483 to 1484, Edward used the arms of his father, debruised with a label of three points Argent.

Ancestry

References

Bibliography 

|-

|-

|-

|-

1473 births
1484 deaths
English royalty
Edward of Middleham, Prince of Wales
Princes of Wales
Heirs apparent who never acceded
15th-century English nobility
15th-century Welsh people
Lords Lieutenant of Ireland
Children of Richard III of England
People from Middleham
Barons Monthermer
Earls of Salisbury
Royalty and nobility who died as children
Sons of kings